The Greater Nanticoke Area School District is a midsized, public school district in Luzerne County. The District is one of the 500 public school districts of Pennsylvania. The District serves Nanticoke, Plymouth and the surrounding  Newport and Conyngham townships.

As of the 2000 census, the school district served a resident population of 19,443. By 2010, the district's population declined to 19,097 people. In 2009, the per capita income was $16,077 while the median family income was $37,672. In the Commonwealth, the median family income was $49,501  and the United States median family income was $49,445, in 2010.

The Greater Nanticoke Area School District operates three schools: a high school (grades 9-12), Educational Center (grades 6-8), Elementary Center (grades 3-5), and Kennedy early learning center (grades prek-2). It used to operate Lincoln Elementary and K.M.Smith Elementary, but they closed.

Extracurriculars
The district offers a variety of clubs and sports. In 2010, the Greater Nanticoke Area varsity softball team won the state championship. A notable news source for the Greater Nanticoke Area High School is the student newspaper called "The GNA Insider".

References

External links
Official website

School districts in Luzerne County, Pennsylvania